The French West India Company was a French trading company founded on 28 May 1664, some three months before the foundation of the corresponding eastern company, by Jean-Baptiste Colbert and dissolved on 2 January 1674. The company received the French possessions of the Atlantic coasts of Africa and America, and was granted a monopoly on trade with America, which was to last for forty years. It was supposed to populate Canada, using the profits of the sugar economy that began in Guadeloupe. Its capital was six million pounds and its headquarters was in Le Havre.

The stock of the company was so considerable that in less than six months 45 vessels were equipped with which they took possession of all the places in their grant, and established commerce. On 2 January 1674, the grant was revoked, and the various countries reunited to the king's dominions, as before; the king reimbursed the actions of the adventurers.

This revocation was owing partly to the financial difficulties of the company, caused by its losses in the Franco-Dutch War with rival European nations, which had necessitated it to borrow large sums and even to alienate its exclusive privilege for the coasts of Guinea, but also to its having in good measure answered its end, which was to recover the commerce of the West Indies from the Dutch, who had taken it away from them. The French merchants being so accustomed to trafficking in the Antilles, by permission of the company, and were so attached to it that it was not doubted they would support the commerce after the dissolution of the company.

Action of the company in New France (Canada)

In 1665 the company obtained the Regiment Carignan-Salières to provide security against Iroquois invasion, and contributed to the settlement of the colony with the arrival of 1200 men from the Dauphiné, Liguria, Piedmont and Savoy. In 1666, Jean Talon organized the first census, counting 3215 inhabitants. The population of the colony grew to 6700 inhabitants in 1672, as a result of policies encouraging marriage and fertility. In 1667, several tribes of Iroquois, the Mohawks and Oneidas, agreed to make peace.

Charles Aubert de La Chesnaye, fur trader in Tadoussac between 1663 and 1666, was appointed general clerk of the company from 1666 to 1669, when he left the company for logging in Lac-Saint-Jean, a break and a long stay in La Rochelle, which allows him to establish business relations with several European countries and owning several vessels.

Upon his return to Canada Charles Aubert de La Chesnaye obtained shortly after the dissolution of the company, from 1675 and until 1681, the rights of the firm of the Company of the West and his friend Jean Oudiette, and holding the monopoly of beaver pelts, then Canada's main export. In 1672, Jean Talon granted him, with two other partners, the lordship of Percé to serve as a port for fishing boats. He received the seigniory of Riviere-du-Loup December 23, 1673. Chesnaye also bought half the fiefs of St. Francis and St. John (1677), the lordships of the park east of Rivière-du-Loup (1675), and Hare Island (1677).

Action in the Caribbean

Tobacco plantations were highly developed in other French colonies. The company got a monopoly on the slave trade from Senegal, which since 1658 belonged to the Company of Cape Verde and Senegal. In 1666 the company created two counters in Dahomey (Benin), Savi and Ouidah, which bought other tropical products.

The company faced the interests of the French settlers in the Caribbean, who were engaged in smuggling with the Dutch. Its commercial monopoly led to the resale price of sugar becoming prohibitive compared to sugarcane produced and refined in Barbados and Jamaica.

French sugar planters complained and accused the company of not delivering enough slaves, while neighboring islands controlled by other European powers had imported slaves on a large scale from the early 1670s.

In 1665, the company acquired Saint Croix from the Knights of Malta (a vassal state of the Kingdom of Sicily) who had ruled the island in the name of Louis XIV since 1651. The colony was evacuated to San Domingo in 1695, when France battled the English and Dutch in the War of the Grand Alliance. The island then lay uninhabited and abandoned for another 38 years when it was sold to the Danish West India Company.

See also 
 Charles Bazire
 List of trading companies
 Senegal Company, the successor to its territories in West Africa

References

External links

Another account in ghcaraibe.org

1664 establishments in France
Companies established in 1664
1674 disestablishments in Europe
Defunct companies of France
History of the Caribbean
18th century in France
Trading companies of France
Chartered companies
Le Havre